Carlos Ernesto Murillo Duarte (born December 10, 1970) is a Panamanian former professional boxer who competed from 1990 to 2005. He held the World Boxing Association light flyweight title in 1996.

Professional career

Murillo turned professional in 1990 and amassed a record of 32-2 before he beat Choi Hi-yong to win the WBA light flyweight title. He would go on to lose the title four months later Keiji Yamaguchi. Murillo would get another world title opportunity this time against Colombia's Mauricio Pastrana; he would lose via ninth round stoppage.

Professional boxing record

See also
List of world light-flyweight boxing champions

References

External links

 

1970 births
Living people
Panamanian male boxers
Mini-flyweight boxers
Light-flyweight boxers
Flyweight boxers
World light-flyweight boxing champions
World Boxing Association champions